The following is a list of people who have served as mayors of the city of Buffalo in the U.S. state of New York.

List of mayors

Number of mayors by party affiliation

History
In 1853, the charter of the city was amended to include the town of Black Rock and the city proper was divided into thirteen wards. In addition, the term of city offices, including mayor changed from a one-year term to a two-year term and was elected directly by the people.

Mayoral elections

(winners are in bold)

See also
 Timeline of Buffalo, New York

References

Buffalo, New York